Mrs. Pepperpot (translation: the teaspoon lady) is a fictional character in a series of children's books created by the Norwegian author Alf Prøysen.

The first book in the series was printed in 1956. The main character, Mrs. Pepperpot, is a little old lady who lives in a cottage in the countryside together with her husband, Mr. Pepperpot.
Mrs. Pepperpot has a secret – she occasionally shrinks to the size of a pepperpot, but nevertheless always manages to cope with the tricky situations that she encounters, at least partially thanks to the fact that upon shrinking she also gains the ability to understand and talk to all animals.

Some of the Mrs. Pepperpot stories are:
 Little Old Mrs. Pepperpot
 Mrs. Pepperpot and the Mechanical Doll
 Mrs. Pepperpot buys Macaroni
 Queen of the Crows
 Mrs. Pepperpot at the Bazaar
 Mr. Puffblow's Hat
 Miriam from America
 Jumping Jack and his Friends
 The Potato with Big Ideas
 The Mice and the Christmas Tree
 Never Take No for an Answer
 Mr. Learn-a-lot and the Singing Midges
 Mrs. Pepperpot to the Rescue
 Mrs. Pepperpot on the Warpath
 The Nature Lesson
 The Shoemaker's Doll
 Mrs. Pepperpot is Taken for a Witch
 The Little Mouse Who was Very Clever
 Mrs. Pepperpot's Birthday
 The Dancing Bees
 How the King Learned to Eat Porridge
 Mrs. Pepperpot Turns Fortune-Teller
 The Fairytale Boy
 The Ski-Race
 Mrs. Pepperpot Again
 Mrs. Pepperpot and the Bilberries
 Mrs. Pepperpot Minds the Baby
 Mrs. Pepperpot's Penny Watchman
 The Bad Luck Story
 Mrs. Pepperpot and the Moose
 Mrs. Pepperpot Finds a Hidden Treasure
 Mr. Pepperpot
 The Ogres
 The Good Luck Story
 Mr Big Toe's Journey
 A Concertina Concert
 A Birthday Party in Topsy Turvy Town
 Father Christmas and the Carpenter
 Mrs. Pepperpot in the Magic Wood
 Mrs. Pepperpot in the Puppet Show
 Midsummer Eve with the Ogres
 Mrs. Pepperpot and the Baby Crow
 Mrs. Pepperpot Learns to Swim
 Mrs. Pepperpot Gives a Party
 Sir Mark the Valiant
 Mrs. Pepperpot Turns Detective
 Mrs. Pepperpot and the Brooch Hunt
 Mrs. Pepperpot's Outing
 Mrs. Pepperpot has a Visitor from America
 Gaby Gob gets a Letter from the King
 Mrs. Pepperpot and the Budgerigar
 The New Year's Eve Adventure
 Fate and Mrs. Pepperpot
 Mrs. Pepperpot Helps Arne
 Spring Cleaning
 Easter Chicks
 The Cuckoo
 Midsummer Romance
 Mrs. Pepperpot and the Pedlar
 The Moose Hunt
 Mr. Pepperpot and the Weather
 Mrs. Pepperpot in Hospital
 Mrs. Pepperpot's Christmas

Adaptations
In 1967 and 1976, it was the choice for the Sveriges Television's Christmas calendar. In Swedish the character is called Teskedsgumman, which is a direct translation from Norwegian.

A Japanese anime television series adaptation of "Mrs. Pepperpot" called Spoon Oba-san was produced by Studio Pierrot in the 1980s.

1956 books
Series of children's books
Fiction about size change
Pepperpot, Mrs.
Pepperpot, Mrs.
Books adapted into television series